TELUS International is a Canadian technology company which provides IT services and multilingual customer service to global clients. Clients include corporations in technology, games, communications and media, eCommerce, financial services, banking, credit cards, fintech, travel & hospitality, healthcare, and automotive industries. 

TELUS International made its debut in the public markets on February 3, 2021, dual-listed on the Toronto Stock Exchange and New York Stock Exchange trading under the ticker symbol TIXT. Its parent company, TELUS, has backed TELUS International's growth, and retains majority control.

Services 

Among TELUS International's services are digital strategy, innovation, consulting and design, digital transformation and IT lifecycle services, data annotation and intelligent automation.

History and acquisitions 
In 2005, TELUS invested in Ambergris Solutions, a BPO company in the Philippines, to offer additional customer service for North America. Ambergris Solutions rebranded to TELUS International in 2007.

In 2008, TELUS International invested in Transactel to establish CX centers in Guatemala and El Salvador. TELUS International invested in CallPoint New Europe in 2012 and expanded into Bulgaria and Romania. In 2014, Callpoint New Europe rebranded to TELUS International, and Transactel rebranded to TELUS International the following year.

In 2016, Baring Private Equity Asia acquired a 35% stake in TELUS International, with TELUS continuing to hold the remaining 65%. TELUS International acquired Voxpro Group in 2017 and expanded locations in the U.S. It also established a presence in Ireland. In 2018, TELUS International invested in Xavient Digital for their digital and IT solutions portfolio, and also to enable delivery centres in India. The company then acquired Competence Call Center in 2020, expanding its European presence. In 2021, Fast Company named the company one its 100 Best Workplaces for Innovatorshttps://www.fastcompany.com/best-workplaces-for-innovators/2021?view=1 in the International category.https://www.fastcompany.com/90659111/best-workplaces-innovators-2021-international TELUS International acquired Lionbridge AI, adding data annotation, in 2021.  In 2021, the company was listed on the Toronto and New York stock exchanges on February 3 under the ticker TIXT. This listing was the largest-ever tech IPO for the TSX. TELUS International acquired Playment in 2021. Telus International acquired the U.S. company WillowTree in the beginning of 2023.https://www.bizjournals.com/columbus/inno/stories/news/2023/01/17/telus-willowtree-hiring-new-jobs-columbus.html The sale was for U.S.$1.2-billion.https://www.theglobeandmail.com/business/article-telus-international-acquiring-us-based-mobile-app-company-for-us12/

TELUS International reports fourth quarter and full-year 2022 results, delivering double-digit revenue growth, strong profitability and cash flow for the year; sets 2023 outlook for continued robust double-digit profitable growth.https://www.businesswire.com/news/home/20230209005302/en/TELUS-International-reports-fourth-quarter-and-full-year-2022-results-delivering-double-digit-revenue-growth-strong-profitability-and-cash-flow-for-the-year-sets-2023-outlook-for-continued-robust-double-digit-profitable-growth | access-date=2023-02-09

Offices 

TELUS International has delivery centre across North and Central America, Europe and Asia. It is still based in Vancouver.https://www.sfgate.com/business/article/telus-international-q4-earnings-snapshot-17773602.php

TELUS Days of Giving 
TELUS Days of Giving is a charitable initiative in which team members volunteer in their local communities.

Since 2007, TELUS International and its team members have impacted the lives of more than a million people around the globe through volunteer activities and charitable giving, including Community Board donations. Events have included building a community center in Romania, constructing a health clinic in Guatemala, developing a youth center in El Salvador, planting forests in Bulgaria and renovating schools in the Philippines.

See also
Telus Communications

References 

Canadian companies established in 2005
Telus
Companies listed on the New York Stock Exchange
Companies listed on the Toronto Stock Exchange
2021 initial public offerings